Marianella Castellanos (born April 15, 1984 in Acarigua, Portuguesa, Venezuela) is a Venezuelan softball player. She competed for Venezuela at the 2008 Summer Olympics.

References

Living people
1984 births
Olympic softball players of Venezuela
Softball players at the 2008 Summer Olympics
Venezuelan softball players
People from Acarigua